"Made to Worship" is a song written by Chris Tomlin, Ed Cash and Stephan Sharp. It was featured on Tomlin's album See the Morning. The song reached No. 1 on the Billboard Hot Christian Songs chart. It also stayed at No. 1 on Christian Music Weekly's 20 The Countdown Magazine for sixteen consecutive weeks, and reached its top 20 worship songs of today chart at No. 20. The song was nominated for both Song of the Year and Worship Song of the Year at the 2007 GMA Dove Awards, losing in both categories, with another Tomlin song, "Holy Is the Lord", winning Worship Song of the Year. This song is on the Digital Praise PC game Guitar Praise. In this song will also the compilation album WOW Hits 2008.

Awards 

In 2007, the song was nominated for three Dove Awards: Song of the Year, Pop/Contemporary Recorded Song of the Year, and Worship Song of the Year, at the 38th GMA Dove Awards.

Charts

Weekly charts

Year-end charts

Decade-end charts

References

Chris Tomlin songs
2006 songs
Songs written by Chris Tomlin
Songs written by Ed Cash